This is a list of strikes in Spain. It includes labor strikes, student strikes, etc.

Strikes in Spain 

 July 2, 1855: The first general strike in Spain. It was motivated by the introduction of self-acting cotton spinning machines in Barcelona.
August 1917.
October 5, 1934.
July 1936.
November 12, 1976.
April 5, 1978.
February 23, 1981.
June 20, 1985.
December 14, 1988: The labour reform of Felipe González government results in 1988 Spanish general strike.
 May 28, 1992: A reform of the unemployment benefits leads to the 28 May 1992 general strike.
 January 27, 1994: CCOO and UGT organized the 27 January 1994 general strike against the labour reform.
 June 20, 2002: The 20 June 2002 general strike by CCOO and UGT against the reform of the unemployment benefits.
 April 10, 2003: A 2-hour strike organized by CCOO and UGT against the 2003 invasion of Iraq. CNT and CGT call for a general strike of 24 hours.
 September 29, 2010: The 29 September 2010 general strike against labour reform, wages cut in public sector and pension freezes. It was organized by CCOO, UGT and CGT.
 January 27, 2011: The 27 January 2011 general strike against the pensions reform, organized by ELA, LAB, CIG, CGT y CNT in Catalunya, Galicia, Euskadi and Navarre. Demonstrations were held in other cities.
 March 29, 2012: The 29 March 2012 general strike (es) was a general strike against the labour reform of Mariano Rajoy government. It was organized by CCOO, UGT, USO, CGT, CNT, Solidaridad Obrera, Co.Bas ELA, LAB, ESK, CIG, CUT, CSI, Intersindical-CSC, SOA, SAT, COS, Intersindical Canaria, FSOC, Confederación Intersindical, STC and Sindicato de Estudiantes.

 November 14, 2012: The 14 November 2012 general strike (es) was a general strike in Spain, Italy, Portugal, Cyprus and Malta. There were solidarity events France, Greece and Belgium.
 March 26, 2014: A student strike starts with demonstrations in 50 cities. They protested against budget cuts in education, the LOMCE law, low quality of education and the dismissal of thousands of teachers. About 50 people were detained by police.
 December 26, 2014: Workers of Renfe and Adif go to strike against privatization of the railway service.
 November 17, 2021: Metalworkers burned street barricades for a second straight day in Spain's southern city of Cádiz, as trade unions demanded wage increases in line with a recent spike in inflation across the European Union. Workers cut some roads leading into Cádiz for a brief period during the morning. They set alight several cars and clashed with police, who responded with rubber bullets. Two police officers suffered minor injuries. Nobody was arrested.

References

See also 
 Strike action
 History of the cotton industry in Catalonia